Toto Millionaire is a 2007 Kenyan comedy film written and directed by Simiyu Barasa. The film stars 10 year old Mungai Mbaya in the lead role who plays the role of Toto. Toto Millionaire film is a simple story of a boy going through problems in life with a sickly mother. But the boy couldn't allow situation hinder him from an opportunity of this life. The film was premiered at the Goethe Institute Auditorium in Nairobi on 13 November 2007.

Cast 
 Mungai Mbaya as Toto
 Joseph Kinuthia as Barry G
 Ainea Ojiambo as Supa

Synopsis 
Toto stumbles on a bottle top that carries a prize worth million in a soft drink lottery. When he goes to collect his prize, he faces hurdles from those who try to steal the prize from him due to his age. But the child manages to overcome the challenges he faces and collects his reward.

References 

2007 films
2007 comedy films
Kenyan comedy films
English-language Kenyan films
2000s English-language films